Escuela Americana (Spanish; used to mean "American school") may refer to:
 Escuela Americana El Salvador (San Salvador)
 American School of Tegucigalpa